Wrap Around Joy is the sixth album by American singer and songwriter Carole King, released in 1974. The album peaked at number one on the Billboard 200 albums chart in late 1974 and spun off successful singles with "Jazzman", reaching number two on the Pop chart and earning Carole King a nomination for Best Pop Vocal Performance, Female  in the 17th Grammy Awards (the award went to Olivia Newton-John for "I Honestly Love You"). Another song from the album, "Nightingale", reached number nine on the Pop chart and number six on the adult contemporary chart.

The album was certified Gold by the RIAA.

Track listing

Personnel
Carole King - piano, vocals, backing vocals
Tom Scott - saxophone on "Jazzman"
Susan Ranney - bass
Andy Newmark - drums
Louise Goffin and Sherry Goffin - backing vocals on "Nightingale"
Mike Altschul - horn
George Bohanon - trombone
Mari Tsumura - violin
Denyse Buffum - viola
Thomas Buffum - violin
The David Campbell String Section - strings on "We Are All in This Together"
The Eddie Kendricks Singers - vocals on "We Are All in This Together"
Gene Coe - horn
Maurice Dicterow - violin
Richard Feves - bass
Chuck Findley - trumpet
Frederick Seykora - cello
Abigale Haness - backing vocals
Jim Horn - saxophone on "Wrap Around Joy"
Dick "Slyde" Hyde - trombone
Danny Kortchmar - guitar, vocals
Charles Larkey - bass
Gordon Marron Strings - violin
Dan Neufeld - viola
Andy Newmark - drums
Dean Parks - guitar
Paul Polivinick - viola
Jay Rosen - violin
Sheldon Sanov - violin
Haim Shtrum - violin
Jeff Solow - cello
Lya Stern - violin
Polly Sweeney - violin
Ernie Watts - horn
Richard Kaufman - violin
Nina Deveritch - cello
Bobby Dubow - violin
Gottfried Hoogeveen - cello
Dan Newfeld - viola
Fred Jackson, Jr. - horn

Charts

Weekly charts

Year-end charts

Certifications

References

1974 albums
Carole King albums
Albums produced by Lou Adler
Ode Records albums